The Optimist is the second studio album by English band New Young Pony Club. It was released on 5 March 2010 on the band's label The Numbers, distributed by the PIAS Entertainment Group. The album showcases a darker, more emotive sound for the band. The songs "Oh Cherie" and "Lost a Girl" were used, respectively, in the third and fourth episodes of the fourth season of Gossip Girl.

Track listing

Personnel
Credits adapted from the liner notes of The Optimist.

New Young Pony Club
 Tahita Bulmer – performer, production
 Lou Hayter – extra vocals , extra piano 
 Sarah Jones – drums , extra vocals , additional drums 
 Andy Spence – performer, production

Additional personnel
 Pete Fraser – saxophone 
 Liz Harry – art direction, design
 Mark McNulty – photography
 Al O'Connel – drum engineering 
 Morgan Quaintance – heys , extra Vox 
 Craig Silvey – mixing
 Tom Stanley – drum engineering

Charts

Release history

References

2010 albums
New Young Pony Club albums
PIAS Recordings albums